Patrik Franksson (born 25 July 1995) is a Filipino-Swedish celebrity and footballer who plays striker for JPV Marikina. Prior to that, he played for Laos F.C. and Kaya FC–Makati. Franksson also teamed up with Liza Soberano for Goldilocks Bakeshop television commercial.

References

External links
 

1995 births
Living people
Swedish footballers
Citizens of the Philippines through descent
Association football forwards